Gomgush is a traditional Armenian banquet stew, resembling dzhash (Ճաշ) but with added ingredients. A gomgush is often served at celebrations including weddings and banquets. Gomgush is a brothy stew including an array of meats and legumes, several vegetables, and spices. Gomgush is typically cooked in the tonir.

Ingredients may include summer squash, green beans, peas, tomato sauce, prunes, garlic, mint, chick peas, Sevan trout, pumpkin, yoghurt, pepper paste, and dill. In Ainteb, gomgush may include the liberal use of dried mint, tomatoes, and lemon juice. Often, when cooked in a tonir or cauldron, the same container may cook hundreds of stews without being washed, contributing to growingly complex tastes.

See also
 List of stews

References 
 Armenian Food: Fact, Fiction & Folklore  By Irina Petrosian, David Underwood

Stews
Armenian cuisine